The 2013 Republika Srpska Cup Final will be the 20th final of the Republika Srpska Football Cup, the highest football cup competition in Bosnia and Herzegovina.

Matches

Report for the first leg

Details for the first leg

|}

Republika Srpska Cup